Rosetta Miller-Perry (born 1934) is an African-American journalist.

Early life and education
Rosetta Miller-Perry was in 1934 in Coraopolis, Pennsylvania. She received her early education from McKinley Elementary School and Coraopolis Junior High School. Later, she attended Howard University and Herzl Community College for further education.

Miller-Perry holds a BS degree in chemistry from the University of Memphis.

Career
Miller-Perry started her career by joining the United States Navy in 1954.

In 1990, she founded Perry and Perry Associates and started publishing a magazine called Contempora. A year later, she founded the Tennessee Tribune, an African-American newspaper. She is also the founder of Greater Nashville Black Chamber of Commerce.

In 2019, she received the National Newspaper Publishers Association award.

The Rosetta I. Miller Scholarship given by the Memphis State University and Rosetta Miller-Perry Award for Best Film by a Black Filmmaker awarded at the Nashville Film Festival are named after her.

Recognition
 Tennessee Women's Hall of Fame
 National Newspaper Publishers Association Award

References

1934 births
Living people
American journalists